Geukensia granosissima, common name the southern ribbed mussel, is a species of saltwater mussel, a marine bivalve mollusk in the family Mytilidae, the mussels.

Distribution
This species is native to the Atlantic coast of North America. Southern ribbed mussels are found in the Florida Keys, the Caribbean and the Gulf of Mexico. On the Atlantic coast to the north, the closely related ribbed mussel Geukensia demissa is found.

Description
The ribbed shells of this species attain a length of 10 cm.

References
 Geukensia granosissima (G.B. Sowerby III, 1914)  World Register of Marine Species (2012)

Mytilidae
Fauna of the Caribbean
Fauna of the Dominican Republic
Molluscs of Mexico
Molluscs of the United States
Molluscs described in 1914